17th New York Film Critics Circle Awards
January 20, 1952(announced December 27, 1951)

A Streetcar Named Desire
The 17th New York Film Critics Circle Awards, honored the best filmmaking of 1951.

Winners
Best Film:
A Streetcar Named Desire
Best Actor:
Arthur Kennedy - Bright Victory
Best Actress:
Vivien Leigh - A Streetcar Named Desire
Best Director:
Elia Kazan - A Streetcar Named Desire
Best Foreign Language Film:
Miracle in Milan (Miracolo a Milano) • Italy

References

External links
1951 Awards

1951
New York Film Critics Circle Awards, 1951
1951 in American cinema
1951 in New York City